Osiander was the name of a family of German Lutheran scholars and theologians:
 Andreas Osiander
 Lucas Osiander the Elder, son of Andreas Osiander
 Andreas Osiander II, eldest son of Lucas Osiander the Elder
 Lucas Osiander the Younger, son of Lucas Osiander the Elder
 Johann Adam Osiander, nephew of the two next preceding
 Johannes Osiander, son of Johann Adam Osiander
 Johann Rudolf Osiander, son of Johannes Osiander
 Johann Ernst Osiander

References